Rainer Makatsch (born 1 July 1946) is a German ice hockey player. He competed in the men's tournament at the 1972 Winter Olympics.

He is the father of actress Heike Makatsch.

References

1946 births
Living people
German ice hockey players
Olympic ice hockey players of West Germany
Ice hockey players at the 1972 Winter Olympics
Sportspeople from Leipzig